This list of books by Martin Luther contains a bibliography of the works of Martin Luther in print, online or other formats, in English translation and original language. Martin Luther resisted the publication of a combined edition of his works for multiple reasons, although he finally consented to write a preface to such a publication in 1539.

Catalog 
Chronological catalog of Luther's life events, letters, and works with citations, 478 pages, 5.45 MB
LettersLuther4.doc

Collected works

Original languages 

The critical complete edition of Luther's works is D. Martin Luthers Werke: kritische Gesammtausgabe, also known as Weimarer Ausgabe or the "Weimar Edition" in English. It was begun in 1883 and completed in 2009 with 121 volumes.

English 

 Luther, Martin. Luther's Works. 55 Volumes. Various translators. Minneapolis: Fortress Press; St. Louis: Concordia Publishing House, 1957-1986.
 Luther's Works Companion Volume Luther The Expositor
 Vol. 1 Lectures on Genesis Chapters 1-5
 Vol. 3 Lectures on Genesis Chapters 15-20
 Vol. 9. Lectures on Deuteronomy
 Vol. 12 Selected Psalms
 Vol. 13 Selected Psalms II
 Vol. 31 Career of Reformer
 Vol. 36 Word and Sacrament II
 Vol. 40 Church and Ministry II
  Vol. 51 Sermons I
 Luther, Martin. Select works Vol. II, tr. Henry Cole. London: W. Simkin and R. Marshall, 1826.
 Luther, Martin. Select works Vol. III, tr. Henry Cole. London: W. Simkin and R. Marshall, 1826.
 Luther, Martin. Martin Luther's Writings (Largest Online English Luther Library)

Collected works by type

Luther's German Bible translation 
 Luther, Martin. D. Martin Luthers Werke, Kritische Gesamtausgabe. Die Deutsche Bibel. 12 vols. Weimar: Verlag Hermann Böhlaus Nochfolger, 1906-61.
 Die Luther-Bibel von 1534. Kolorierte Faksimileausgabe, 2 Bände und Begleitband (v. Stephan Füssel), Taschen Verlag, 2002 (Rezension und einige schöne Auszüge)
 Biblia Germanica. Luther-Übersetzung 1545, Ausgabe letzter Hand. Faksimilierte Handausgabe nach dem im Besitz der Deutschen Bibelgesellschaft befindlichen Originaldruck; einspaltig. Mit zahlreichen Initialen und Holzschnitten des Meisters MS, an deren Gestaltung Luther selbst mitgewirkt hat. Deutsche Bibelgesellschaft, 1967. 
 D. Martin Luther. Die gantze Heilige Schrifft. Der komplette Originaltext von 1545 in modernem Schriftbild. Hrsg. von Hans Volz unter Mitarbeit von Heinz Blanke; Textredaktion Friedrich Kur. Rogner & Bernhard, München 1972 (Neuausgabe: Ed. Lempertz, Bonn 2004), 
 Die Luther-Bibel. Originalausgabe 1545 und revidierte Fassung 1912 (CD-ROM), Digitale Bibliothek 29, Berlin 2002,  (Es handelt sich um Luthers frühneuhochdeutschen Text.)
 Wikisource Lutherbibel
 Die Bibel (lateinisch/deutsch)
 Luthers Biblia 1545
 Audio Bibel in der Lutherübersetzung zum Download
 Lutherbibel von 1984
 Text der Lutherbibel von 1912
 Lutherdeutsch.de

Letters

Original languages 
 Luther, Martin. D. Martin Luthers Werke, Kritische Gesamtausgabe. Briefwechsel. 18 vols. Weimar: Verlag Hermann Böhlaus Nachfolger, 1930-85.
 Luther, Martin. Dr. Martin Luthers Sämmtliche Werke. Briefwechsel. Ed. Ernst Ludwig Enders. Calw and Stuttgart.
Luther, Martin. Dr. Martin Luthers Sämmtliche Werke. Briefwechsel, Bierter Band. Ed. Ernst Ludwig Enders. Calw and Stuttgart, 1891.
Luther, Martin. Dr. Martin Luthers Sämmtliche Werke. Briefwechsel Fünster Band. Ed. Ernst Ludwig Enders. Calw and Stuttgart, 1893.
Luther, Martin. Dr. Martin Luthers Sämmtliche Werke. Briefwechsel, Sechster Band. Ed. Ernst Ludwig Enders. Calw and Stuttgart, 1895.
Luther, Martin. Dr. Martin Luthers Sämmtliche Werke. Briefwechsel, Achter Band. Ed. Ernst Ludwig Enders. Calw and Stuttgart, 1898.
Luther, Martin. Dr. Martin Luthers Sämmtliche Werke. Briefwechsel, Echutee Band. Ed. Ernst Ludwig Enders. Calw and Stuttgart, 1903.

English 
 Luther, Martin. Luther's Correspondence and Other Contemporary Letters, 2 vols., tr.and ed. by Preserved Smith, Charles Michael Jacobs, The Lutheran Publication Society, Philadelphia, Pa. 1913, 1918. Vol. 1 (1507-1521) and Vol. 2 (1521-1530) from Google Books. Reprint of Vol. 1, Wipf & Stock Publishers (March 2006). 
  Luther, Martin. The Letters of Martin Luther, tr. Margaret, A. Currie. London: Macmillan, 1908.
  Luther, Martin. Luther's Letters to Women, ed. K. Zimmermann, tr. Malcolm. London: Chapman and Hall, 1865.
  Luther, Martin. A Simple Rite for the Ministry of a Pastor with a Demonically-Afflicted Person (Letter to Severin Schulze, June 1, 1545) from  Luther: Letters of Spiritual Counsel. Philadelphia: The Westminster Press, 1960, p. 52.)

Commentaries 
  Luther, Martin. A manual of the Book of psalms: Or, The Subject-contents of All the Psalms , tr. Henry Cole. London: R.B. Seeley and W. Burnside, 1837.
  Luther, Martin. Commentary on the Epistle to the Galatians, tr. Theodore Graebner. Grand Rapids, Michigan: Zondervan Publishing House, 1949.

Sermons 
  Luther, Martin. A Selection of the Most Celebrated Sermons of Martin Luther, ed. K. Zimmermann, tr. Malcolm. New York: S. & D. A. Forbes, 1830

Biography 
  Luther, Martin. The Life of Luther Written by Himself, ed. M. Michelet. tr. William Hazlitt. London: George Bell and Sons, 1904.

Music 

 Luther, Martin, Luther: Hymns, Ballads, Chants, Truth. 4 CD recording. St. Louis: Concordia Publishing House, 2005.
 Luther, Martin. Martin Luther's Spiritual Songs, tr. Richard Massie. Chester: Hatchard & Son, 1854.
 Luther, Martin. The Hymns of Martin Luther: Set to their original melodies; with an English version. ed. Bacon, Leonard Woolsey and Allen, Nathan H. Publisher unknown, Year published, unknown.

Table talk 
 Luther, Martin. D. Martin Luthers Werke, Kritische Gesamtausgabe. Tischreden. 6 vols. Weimar: Verlag Hermann Böhlaus Nochfolger, 1912-21.
 Luther, Martin. Luther's table talk; or, Some choice fragments from the familiar discourse of that godly man. ed. & trans. Charles Heel et al. London: A. & R. Spottiswoode. 1832
 Luther's Table Talk: A Critical Study. New York: Columbia University Press, 1907.  from Google Books
 Luther, Martin. Table Talk. London: Religious Tract Society. 18-?.

Pamphlet
 Passional Christi und Antichristi. Rhau-Grunenberg, Dec 21, 1521, woodcuts by Lucas Cranach the Elder  (Original language)

Large Catechism 

 "The Large Catechism." Concordia: The Lutheran Confessions: A Reader's Edition of the Book of Concord. Tr. W. H. T. Dau and G. F. Bente. Rev. and Updated by P. T. McCain, R. C. Baker, G. E. Veith and E. A. Engelbrecht. St. Louis: Concordia Publishing House, 2005, 375-470.
 Triglot Concordia. tr. and ed. F. Bente and W. H.T. Dau. St. Louis: Concordia Publishing House, 1921.

Smalcald Articles 

 "The Smalcald Articles." Concordia: The Lutheran Confessions: A Reader's Edition of the Book of Concord. Tr. W. H. T. Dau and G. F. Bente. Rev. and Updated by P. T. McCain, R. C. Baker, G. E. Veith and E. A. Engelbrecht. St. Louis: Concordia Publishing House, 2005, 279-313.
 Triglot Concordia. Tr. and ed. W. H. T. Dau and G. F. Bente. St. Louis: Concordia Publishing House, 1921.

Small Catechism 

 "Enchiridion: The Small Catechism." Concordia: The Lutheran Confessions: A Reader's Edition of the Book of Concord. Tr. W. H. T. Dau and G. F. Bente. Rev. and Updated by P. T. McCain, R. C. Baker, G. E. Veith and E. A. Engelbrecht. St. Louis: Concordia Publishing House, 2005, 333-374.
 Triglot Concordia. tr. and ed. F. Bente and W. H.T. Dau. St. Louis: Concordia Publishing House, 1921.

See also
 Resources about Martin Luther

References

Luther, Martin
Luther, Martin
Luther, Martin